Albert Western (13 February 1923 – 21 October 1987) was an Australian rules footballer who played for the Richmond Football Club in the Victorian Football League (VFL).

Notes

External links 
		

1923 births
1987 deaths
Australian rules footballers from Western Australia
Richmond Football Club players
South Fremantle Football Club players